Strakonice is a town in the South Bohemian Region of the Czech Republic. It has about 22,000 inhabitants.

Administrative parts
Strakonice is made up of town parts of Strakonice I and Strakonice II, and villages of Dražejov, Hajská, Modlešovice, Přední Ptákovice, Střela and Virt.

Geography
It lies mostly in the northern tip of the České Budějovice Basin, but the municipal territory also extends to the Blatná Uplands on the north, and to the Bohemian Forest Foothills on the south.

The town is situated at the confluence of the Volyňka and Otava rivers. There are several ponds in the territory, the largest of them are Velkoholský and Blatský.

In the municipal territory there are the nature reserve Bažantnice u Pracejovic and the nature monument Tůně u Hajské.

History

A moated castle on the Otava River was built by the noble family Bavors of Strakonice at the beginning of the 13th century, the first written mention of the castle is from 1235. The first written mention of the village of Strakonice is from 1243, when the Church of Saint Wenceslaus already existed and when Bavors donated a part of the castle and several villages in the vicinity to the Knights Hospitaller of the Order of Saint John. In 1318, Strakonice already was a town.

From 1402, the Knights Hospitaller owned the whole castle as well as the surrounding manor. In 1420 the Hussite commander Jan Žižka occupied Strakonice, but failed to capture the fortress. Strakonice Castle experienced an extensive reconstruction to a representation residence of the Grand Priors of the Order in the 16th century, the later modifications were minor only. After the Thirty Years' War, the castle has lost its significance.

During the 19th century, the town was industrialized. In the 1860s, the town was connected with České Budějovice and Plzeň by railroad, which helped its further development.

Demographics

Climate
Strakonice has a cool, wet, and temperate inland version of a humid continental climate (Dfb).

Economy

Since the 19th century Strakonice was a main production site for fez hats and it also became an industrial centre known for its motorbikes and hand guns production.

Strakonice is also known for its brewery called "Dudák – Burghers' Brewery Strakonice", located nearby the castle. It produces the beer under the brand Strakonický Dudák. The Strakonice Burghers' Brewery is the last brewery in the Czech Republic to still be owned by a town. The tradition of beer brewing in the town started in 1367 and the Burghers' Brewery was founded in 1649.

Transport
Strakonice lies the railway line of national importance Brno–Jihlava–České Budějovice–Strakonice–Plzeň, and on the regional railway line Strakonice–Volary.

Culture

Every year, the town hosts the International Bagpipe Festival. The town's bagpipe tradition refers to the famous work of Josef Kajetán Tyl Strakonický dudák ("The Bagpiper of Strakonice").

Sights
Most of the historic buildings were demolished during the 20th century. The Strakonice Castle today serves as a regional museum and gallery. Its exhibitions focus on motorcycles, weapons, bagpipers and the traditional fez production. The Rumpál Tower serves as a lookout tower.

Notable people

Jan Antonín Losy (c. 1650–1721), lute player and composer
František Čelakovský (1799–1852), writer and translator
Martin Mathias Secor (1841–1911), American businessman
Leopold Ehrmann (1886–1951), architect
Riccardo Pick-Mangiagalli (1882–1949), Italian composer
Xena Longenová (1891–1928), actress
Josef Skupa (1892–1957), puppeteer
Věra Machoninová (born 1928), architect
Marie Poledňáková (1941–2022), film director
Pavel Pavel (born 1957), engineer and experimental archaeologist
Roman Turek (born 1970), ice hockey player
Alexander Salák (born 1987), ice hockey player
Zdeněk Ondrášek (born 1988), footballer
Jindřich Staněk (born 1996), footballer
Vít Krejčí (born 2000), basketball player

Twin towns – sister cities

Strakonice is twinned with:
 Bad Salzungen, Germany
 Calderdale, England, United Kingdom
 Lengnau, Switzerland

Strakonice also has friendly relations with Rawicz in Poland.

References

External links

Cities and towns in the Czech Republic
Populated places in Strakonice District
Prácheňsko